Karaikaddu is a revenue village in Cuddalore district, state of Tamil Nadu, India.

Villages in Cuddalore district
Cities and villages in Cuddalore taluk